The MIT Department of Physics has over 120 faculty members, is often cited as the largest physics department in the United States, and hosts top-ranked programs. It offers the SB, SM, PhD, and ScD degrees. Fourteen alumni of the department and nine current or former faculty members (two of whom were also students at MIT) have won the Nobel Prize in Physics.

Academics

Undergraduate academics
There are two paths to earning a bachelor's degree (SB) in physics from MIT.  The first, "Course 8 Focused Option", is for students intending to continue studying physics in graduate school. The track offers a rigorous education in various fields in fundamental physics including classical and quantum mechanics, statistical physics, general relativity, electrodynamics, and higher mathematics.

The second, "Course 8 Flexible Option" is designed for those students who would like to develop a strong background in physics but who would like to branch off into other research directions or more unconventional career paths, such as information theory, computer science, finance, and biophysics. A significant part of the student's third and fourth undergraduate years are left open for relevant electives and graduate classes, which then form a specialization. Both tracks have a strong emphasis on laboratory instruction, with the third year often reserved for two "Junior Lab" courses. Most students partaking in undergraduate research or a research-oriented internship.

Graduate academics
The department offers doctoral degrees in the following divisions: astrophysics, atomic and optical physics, biophysics, experimental condensed matter physics, theoretical condensed matter physics, experimental nuclear/particle physics, theoretical nuclear/particle physics, plasma physics, and quantum computing.

Research
The department is divided into four main research areas, namely a) astrophysics, b) atomic, biophysics, condensed matter, and plasma physics, c) experimental nuclear and particle physics, and d) theoretical nuclear and particle physics. A large amount of research is conducted the department's 17 affiliated labs and centers, a list which includes the Research Laboratory of Electronics, the Plasma Science and Fusion Center, the Center for Theoretical Physics, the Condensed Matter Theory Group, the MIT–Harvard Center for Ultracold Atoms, and LIGO.

Notable faculty 
The Nobel laureates in the faculty are:
 Charles Townes (1964)
 Samuel C.C. Ting (1976)
 Steven Weinberg (1979)
 Jerome I. Friedman (1990)
 Henry Kendall (1990)
 Clifford Shull (1994)
 Wolfgang Ketterle (2001)
 Frank Wilczek (2004)
 Rainer Weiss (2017)

Notable alumni 
See also MIT Department of Physics Alumni for a larger list

Nobel Laureates

Eric Cornell (PhD 1990), Bose–Einstein condensate
Richard Feynman (SB 1939), quantum electrodynamics
Murray Gell-Mann (PhD 1951), quarks
Henry Kendall (PhD 1955), deep inelastic scattering
Robert Laughlin (PhD 1979), fractional quantum Hall effect
William D. Phillips (PhD 1976), laser cooling
Burton Richter (SB 1952, PhD 1956), J/psi particle
Adam Riess (SB 1992), high-Z supernova search team
John Robert Schrieffer (SB 1953), BCS theory
William Shockley (PhD 1936), transistor
George Smoot (SB 1966, PhD 1970), cosmic microwave background radiation
Carl E. Wieman (SB 1973), Bose–Einstein condensate
Rainer Weiss (SB 1965, PhD 1962), LIGO
Andrea Ghez (SB 1982), supermassive black hole in galaxy

Other major physics discoveries

 Gerald Guralnik (SB 1958), Higgs mechanism and Higgs boson
 Carl Richard Hagen (SB & SM 1958, PhD 1962), Higgs mechanism and Higgs boson

Breakthrough Prizes in Fundamental Physics

Alan Guth (SB & SM 1969, PhD 1972), theory of inflation
Cumrun Vafa (SB 1981), string theory
Andrew Strominger (PhD 1982), string theory
Charles L. Bennett (PhD 1984), WMAP 
Charles Kane (PhD 1989), topological insulators
Eugene Mele (PhD 1978), topological insulators

In government

Solomon J. Buchsbaum (PhD 1957), chair of White House Science Council under Bush and Reagan
Shirley Ann Jackson (SB 1968, PhD 1973), chair of US Nuclear Regulatory Commission, president of RPI, second black woman to earn a physics PhD in the U.S.
Lucas Papademos (SB 1970), prime minister of Greece

Astronauts

 Ronald McNair (PhD 1976), Challenger astronaut
 Jerome J. Apt (PhD 1976)
 John M. Grunsfeld (SB 1980)
 Timothy Creamer (SM 1992)
 Neil Woodward (SB 1984)

Fictional alumni 

 Gordon Freeman from Half-Life video games - has a doctorate in theoretical physics from MIT
 Tony Stark from Iron Man - received degrees in physics and electrical engineering from MIT at age 19

See also
 Physical Science Study Committee, a leader in modernization of science teaching in the 2nd half of the 20th century.

References

External links
 MIT Department of Physics website
 MIT OpenCourseWare: Physics

Physics Department
Physics departments in the United States